Sergey Tarasevich (born 18 February 1973) is a Belarusian rower. He competed in the men's quadruple sculls event at the 1996 Summer Olympics.

References

External links
 

1973 births
Living people
People from Svietlahorsk District
Belarusian male rowers
Olympic rowers of Belarus
Rowers at the 1996 Summer Olympics
Sportspeople from Gomel Region